Jakub Smektała (born 26 August 1987 in Rawicz) is a Polish footballer who plays for Wisła Puławy.

Career

Club
In January 2011, he joined Ruch Chorzów on a three-year contract which will apply from 1 July 2011.

References

External links
 
 

1987 births
Living people
Polish footballers
Ekstraklasa players
Piast Gliwice players
Ruch Chorzów players
People from Rawicz County
Jarota Jarocin players
Sportspeople from Greater Poland Voivodeship
Zawisza Bydgoszcz players
Association football midfielders
Wisła Puławy players